Garra emarginata is a species of ray-finned fish in the genus Garra endemic to the Periyar River in Kerala, India.

References

Garra
Fish described in 2011